Hot Springs Mountain Tower is a 65.8 metre (216-foot) high observation tower built of lattice steel on Hot Springs Mountain at Hot Springs, Arkansas, USA. Construction began in 1982, and the structure was officially opened to the public on June 3, 1983.

The tower is the third to be built on the mountain. In the nineteenth century, a 75-foot wooden observatory was constructed on the site. This tower was later struck by lightning and burned to the ground. In 1906, the wireless telegraph tower from the 1904 Louisiana Purchase Exposition was relocated to the mountain and renamed the Rix Tower; it stood for there 69 years, finally being torn down in 1975 due to instability.

External links

 Hot Springs Mountain Tower - official site
 

Towers completed in 1983
Towers in Arkansas
Buildings and structures in Hot Springs, Arkansas
Observation towers in the United States
Tourist attractions in Garland County, Arkansas
1983 establishments in Arkansas